Relative Values is a 2000 British comedy film adaptation of the 1950s play of the same name by Noël Coward. It stars Julie Andrews, Colin Firth, William Baldwin, Edward Atterton, Stephen Fry and Jeanne Tripplehorn, and was directed by Eric Styles.
It was filmed on location in the Isle of Man, mainly at The Nunnery, with scenes at Kirk Braddan.

Plot
There is unrest brewing in the upper class Marshwood household, following the announcement of Nigel, The Earl of Marshwood's engagement to glamorous 'American' film actress, Miss Miranda Frayle - having proposed after just two months. Many members of his family and society friends disapprove of the match, fearing Nigel would be marrying below his class.  Meanwhile the Hollywood studio gossip magazines are full of her former on and off-screen love affair with fellow film star - Don Lucas, and other members of the household are overwhelmed with the excitement of having a famous film star marrying into the family.

Lord Marshwood brings Miranda home to his country estate to meet his mother - Felicity, Lady Marshwood.  The visit prompts Lady Marshwood's personal maid - 'Moxie', to reveal that Miranda is in fact her estranged sister and after twenty years of faithful service, she must leave to avoid the 'social timebomb' should it become known.  Unable to do without her, Lady Marshwood and her nephew Peter devise a charade (with the help of the butler) so that Moxie may meet her sister as an equal.  Moxie is subsequently moved from 'below stairs' (with the servants) to 'upstairs' (with the family) and is transformed with make-up, wearing some of Lady Marshwood's clothes and jewellery for dinner with the family - pretending to be an independent lady of means (keeping her real identity secret).  However, during dinner Miranda lies about her past (stating she was born a cockney, had a difficult childhood living in a slum and that her only sister ill-treated her when she was drunk and was in fact dead).  Moxie finds it harder and harder to hide her identity and during dinner (not used to alcohol) she gets more and more drunk, to the amusement of Peter (who has a crush on Lucas) and the horror of Lady Marshwood.  Meanwhile, Miranda's ex-boyfriend - the handsome and dashing film star Don Lucas arrives at Marshwood House, wanting Miranda back.

Lucas contrives a secret meeting with Miranda in the garden, but Lady Marshwood surprises them and catches them kissing.  Realising that he is still in love with Miranda and his presence may break up her son's relationship with Miranda - she invites Lucas to stay the night.  In a fit of jealousy, Lord Marshwood announces that he and Miranda are to be married within days, prompting Moxie to announce (during an argument under the influence of alcohol) her true identity: that Miranda was in fact called 'Freda Birch' and was born in Sidcup, Kent and she broke their late mother's heart by running off to America with her then lover - to the horror of Miranda and Lord Marshwood.

The next morning (Sunday), Lady Marshwood tells Lucas that Miranda is still in love with him, and that his cause is not a hopeless one.  She then tells her son that he should ask Lucas to be his best man, but he tells his mother that he now has doubts about marrying Miranda.  Lady Marshwood subsequently admits to Miranda that she doesn't want her to marry her son and sows the seed that Lord Marshwood may no longer be entirely in love with her.  Moxie apologises to Miranda, telling her that she went too far and has decided to leave Marshwood House.  Once again in the garden, Lady Marshwood catches Miranda kissing Lucas as she finally agrees to leave with him, and she says farewell to Lord Marshwood, ending their engagement.  With Miranda finally gone, Moxie is told she can now stay and the family head off to church (as if nothing had happened) - where Lord Marshwood meets a local well-dressed attractive local lady at the door, who Lady Marshwood gracefully smiles approvingly at, as he goes into church with her instead of Miranda, as originally planned.

Cast

References

External links
 Stage performances of Relative Values as listed at the Theatre Collection archive, University of Bristol

2000 films
2000 comedy films
British comedy films
Plays by Noël Coward
Films about families
British films based on plays
Films set in the 1950s
Films scored by John Debney
2000s English-language films
2000s British films